Little Jacques (French: Le petit Jacques) is a 1923 French silent drama film directed by Georges Lannes and Georges Raulet and starring André Rolane, Henri Baudin and Violette Jyl.

Cast
 André Rolane as Jacques  
 Henri Baudin as Noël Rambert  
 Violette Jyl as Claire Mortal  
 Hélène Darly as Marthe Rambert  
 Marcel Vibert as Daniel Mortal  
 Maurice Schutz as Doctor Artez 
 Pierre Fresnay as Paul Laverdac  
 Gaston Derigal as Gardonne 
 Gilbert Dacheux as Butler  
 Henri Deneyrieu as Gobergau  
 Robert Guilbert as Commissar  
 Jany Delille

References

Bibliography
 Yves Desrichard. Julien Duvivier: Cinquante ans de noirs destins. Durante Editeur, 2001.

External links
 

1923 films
1920s French-language films
French silent feature films
French black-and-white films
French drama films
1923 drama films
Silent drama films
1920s French films